Baitur Rehman Mosque (House of the Gracious) is located in Silver Spring, Maryland in the United States. The mosque was inaugurated by Mirza Tahir Ahmad, the late head of the Ahmadiyya Muslim Community, on October 14, 1994. The mosque is run by the Ahmadiyya Muslim Community. An estimated 5,000 Ahmadis and guests from across the United States attended the opening ceremony.

See also
Islam in Maryland
List of mosques in the United States
Ahmadiyya
Ahmadiyya in the United States
List of Ahmadiyya Muslim Community buildings and structures

References

External links
Photo of Mosque on Panoramio

Ahmadiyya mosques in the United States
Cloverly, Maryland
Mosques in Maryland
Buildings and structures in Silver Spring, Maryland
Religious buildings and structures in Montgomery County, Maryland
Religion in Silver Spring, Maryland
Mosque buildings with domes
Indian-American culture
Community centers in Maryland
Mosques completed in 1994
1994 establishments in Maryland